The C K Pithawala College of Engineering and Technology (CKPCET) in Surat, Gujarat, India, is an engineering college Opening by pramukh Swami Maharaj (BAPS), currently affiliated to GTU (Gujarat Technical University), previously a part of the Veer Narmad South Gujarat University system, located on the banks of the Tapti River near Magdalla Port.

The college was started in 1998 by the Navyug Trust of Surat which is also home to science, arts, commerce and law colleges of the South Gujarat University (now known as Veer Narmad South Gujarat University). Presently around 1500 students are studying in the institute.

Engineering branches 
 Information technology engineering
 Electronics and Communication Engineering
 Mechanical Engineering
 Electrical Engineering
 Civil Engineering
 Computer Engineering

 

The college has a pharmacy and a management college.

External links
 Students on tour 
 Zonal Results - XITIJ 2012
 Inter-Zonal Results - XITIJ 2014
 Conference Hall
 Official website

All India Council for Technical Education
Engineering colleges in Gujarat
Education in Surat